Azizur Rahman (18 January 1917 – 12 September 1978) was a Bangladeshi poet and lyricist. He was awarded Ekushey Padak posthumously by the People's Republic of Bangladesh in 1979 for his outstanding contribution in Bengali literature.

Early life
Rahman was born on 18 January 1917 in the village of Haripur in Kushtia District of the then East Bengal under the British Raj (now Bangladesh) to a Zamindar family. He dropped out of school at his young age and began composing songs for the stage performance of Jatra.

Career
Rahman joined Dhaka Radio Station (now Bangladesh Betar) as a staff artiste in 1954 and composed a large number Patriotic and Islamic songs for the radio. He served as an editor of juvenile monthly Alapani and also served as the literary-editor of daily Paygam from 1964 to 1970.

Notable works

Songs
  (O brother, my palash (a kind of red flower))
  (Don't distress any one)

Literary works
 Dainosaurer Rajya (1962) 
 Jibjantur Katha (1962) 
 Chhutir Dine (1963)
 Ei Mati Ei Desh (1970)

References 

Bengali-language writers
1917 births
1978 deaths
20th-century Bangladeshi male writers
Recipients of the Ekushey Padak
Bangladeshi lyricists